The Peugeot Hoggar was a concept car produced by Peugeot. It was a two-seater off-road vehicle, powered by two diesel engines that drove the front and rear wheels in a four wheel drive configuration.

The name has also been used by Peugeot for a production coupe utility variant of their front engined, front wheel drive Peugeot 207.

It is available as a playable car in Asphalt Xtreme.

Overview
These tubes also served as an air intake and air conduit to the front engine (left-hand tube) and rear engine (right-hand tube).

References

Hoggar